Now That's What I Call Music! 14 may refer to at least two different "Now That's What I Call Music!"-series albums, including
 Now That's What I Call Music 14 (original UK series, 1989 release)
 Now That's What I Call Music! 14 (U.S. series, 2003 release)